Giordano Meloni (born 18 February 1983 in Rome, Italy) is an Italian footballer. He plays as a forward. He is currently playing for A.S.D. Flaminia Civita Castellana.

See also
Football in Italy
List of football clubs in Italy

References

External links
 Giordano Meloni's profile on San Marino Calcio's official website

1983 births
Italian footballers
Living people
Olbia Calcio 1905 players
A.S.D. Victor San Marino players
S.S.D. Castel San Pietro Terme Calcio players
Association football forwards
Footballers from Rome